Fantasy Island is an American fantasy drama television series that aired on ABC from September 26, 1998 to January 23, 1999, during the 1998–99 television season. It was a revival of the original Fantasy Island television series, though starring Malcolm McDowell as Mr. Roarke rather than Ricardo Montalbán. It was developed by Bob Josephon.

Background
In 1998, ABC revived the series in a Saturday time slot. The role of Mr. Roarke was played by Malcolm McDowell and, in contrast to the first series, the supernatural aspect of his character and of Fantasy Island itself was emphasized from the start, along with a dose of dark humor. Director Barry Sonnenfeld, known for his work on The Addams Family movies, was a chief creative force on the new series. Another difference was that the new series was filmed in Hawaii instead of California. The remake followed the fantasies of at least two of Roarke's guests with an additional subplot involving members of his staff – usually Cal and Harry. Whereas the original series featured a separate writer and title for each subplot, the new series was written as several stories but featuring a unified theme and title.

The supporting cast was also expanded for the new series. There was no attempt to reinstate Tattoo, with Roarke instead having a team of assistants – one of whom was a beautiful female shapeshifter named Ariel – who were assigned to help create and maintain the various fantasy worlds created on the island. Apparently these assistants were imprisoned on the island in order to pay off some debt (or earn a second chance at life), sometimes hinting that they were in some kind of Limbo, with many parallels between the regulars and William Shakespeare's The Tempest. It was strongly hinted that the island itself was the source of Roarke's mysterious powers as his assistants have been shown wielding its magic with varying degrees of success. Miranda, Roarke's adopted daughter, was human but grew up on the island with similar powers as well. The series was canceled midway through the season and the remaining episodes aired on the Sci Fi Channel. This version also aired on UPN.

In an attempt to contrast this series with the original, the new Mr. Roarke usually wore black. In the first episode, he picked the single black suit out of a closet of white ones and ordered that the rest be burned. Also during the first episode, an assistant was hammering the bell at the top of the tower, shouting "Plane! Plane!" Mr. Roarke then ordered the assistant to not do that again with such enthusiasm.

Episodes of the revived series regularly opened and ended with a sequence set in a travel agency that actually books the fantasies, operated by two elderly travel agents played by Fyvush Finkel and Sylvia Sidney (in her final acting role). Roarke gave them their assignments by stuffing contracts into a pneumatic tube that somehow connected the island with the travel agency and the outside world.

Characters
 Mr. Roarke (Malcolm McDowell) – The enigmatic host and self-proclaimed "Master of Ceremonies" of Fantasy Island. Capable of working miracles and performing the impossible, he would bring people to the island under the pretense of fulfilling their deepest fantasy. However, ultimately his actions would lead to them receiving what their hearts really wanted or even showing them the error of their ways. While Roarke nearly always had the best intentions for his guests, he possessed a dark sense of humor and a dry wit with sarcastic undertones. Episode 10 revealed that he has an adopted daughter, Miranda, that was the only survivor of a shipwreck near the island. She left the island to live in the outside world after she turned 18. She became a doctor and eventually married, but retained no memories of Fantasy Island or of Roarke while she was off of the island.
 Ariel (Mädchen Amick) — Roarke's second-in-command. While she is incredibly old, physically she appears to be a young woman and has the ability to shapeshift into various women to help guests' fantasies along. She is quite fond of Roarke and appears to have been romantically involved with him sometime in the past. She claims to have been with as many men as there are grains in a fistful of sand.  In Episode 9, it is hinted at that she may be a djinni: she expresses displeasure when a guest calls for a particular fantasy (she says, "You know how I feel about bottles" when presented with one that resembles the one from I Dream of Jeannie, and the scene closes with a clip played of that TV show's theme song). 
 Cal (Louis Lombardi) — While primarily introduced as the island's bellhop, he was also shown to have various other duties such as bartender, waiter, cook, and even helicopter pilot. In his former life, he was a small-time criminal but earned a chance to start life anew at the age of 10 near the end of the season.
 Harry (Edward Hibbert) — The island hotel's concierge. He was apparently the concierge of a burning hotel from which Roarke rescued him.
 Fisher (Fyvush Finkel) — A travel agent who arranges trips to Fantasy Island at the start of each episode; he doesn't like being stuck at the agency while Roarke is on the island and hopes to one day replace him.
 Clia (Sylvia Sidney) — A woman who operates the travel agency with Fisher.

Episodes

References

External links
 
 
 

1990s American anthology television series
1990s American drama television series
1998 American television series debuts
1999 American television series endings
American Broadcasting Company original programming
American fantasy drama television series
American fantasy television series
English-language television shows
Fantasy Island
Television series by Sony Pictures Television
Television series reboots
Television series set on fictional islands
Television shows filmed in Hawaii
Limbo